Sherard may refer to:

Sherard (name)
Sherard, Mississippi, an unincorporated community in Coahoma County, Mississippi, United States
Sherard Bay, a waterway in Nunavut, Canada
Baron Sherard, a former title in the Peerage of Ireland
Sherard baronets, a former baronetcy

See also
Sherrard (disambiguation)